Alan O'Hara (born September 16, 1983) is an Irish footballer currently a free agent. He is a central defender. Alan has previously played for the Richmond Kickers, Thomas University and the Clemson Tigers in which he was named to the NSCAA All-South Region Team.

O'Hara was loaned to the Cleveland City Stars for their first game of the USL2 2007 season.
O'Hara currently plays for the Aegean Hawks of the WPL.

References 

1983 births
Living people
Republic of Ireland association footballers
USL Second Division players
Richmond Kickers Future players
Crystal Palace Baltimore players
Cleveland City Stars players
USL League Two players
Clemson Tigers men's soccer players
Thomas University alumni
Association football defenders
Lansdowne Yonkers FC players